A fetish (derived from the French , which comes from the Portuguese , and this in turn from Latin , 'artificial' and , 'to make') is an object believed to have supernatural powers, or in particular, a human-made object that has power over others. Essentially, fetishism is the attribution of inherent value, or powers, to an object.

Historiography
The term fetish has evolved from an idiom used to describe a type of object created in the interaction between European travelers and Africans in the early modern period to an analytical term that played a central role in the perception and study of non-Western art in general and African art in particular.

William Pietz, who, in 1994, conducted an extensive ethno-historical study of the fetish, argues that the term originated in the coast of West Africa during the sixteenth and seventeenth centuries. Pietz distinguishes between, on the one hand, actual African objects that may be called fetishes in Europe, together with the indigenous theories of them, and on the other hand, "fetish", an idea, and an idea of a kind of object, to which the term above applies.

According to Pietz, the post-colonial concept of "fetish" emerged from the encounter between Europeans and Africans in a very specific historical context and in response to African material culture.

He begins his thesis with an introduction to the complex history of the word:

My argument, then, is that the fetish could originate only in conjunction with the emergent articulation of the ideology of the commodity form that defined itself within and against the social values and religious ideologies of two radically different types of noncapitalist society, as they encountered each other in an ongoing cross-cultural situation. This process is indicated in the history of the word itself as it developed from the late medieval Portuguese , to the sixteenth-century pidgin Fetisso on the African coast, to various northern European versions of the word via the 1602 text of the Dutchman Pieter de Marees... The fetish, then, not only originated from, but remains specific to, the problem of the social value of material objects as revealed in situations formed by the encounter of radically heterogeneous social systems, and a study of the history of the idea of the fetish may be guided by identifying those themes that persist throughout the various discourses and disciplines that have appropriated the term.

Stallybrass concludes that "Pietz shows that the fetish as a concept was elaborated to demonize the supposedly arbitrary attachment of West Africans to material objects. The European subject was constituted in opposition to a demonized fetishism, through the disavowal of the object."

History
Initially, the Portuguese developed the concept of the fetish to refer to the objects used in religious practices by West African natives. The contemporary Portuguese  may refer to more neutral terms such as charm, enchantment, or abracadabra, or more potentially offensive terms such as juju, witchcraft, witchery, conjuration or bewitchment.

The concept was popularized in Europe circa 1757, when Charles de Brosses used it in comparing West African religion to the magical aspects of ancient Egyptian religion. Later, Auguste Comte employed the concept in his theory of the evolution of religion, wherein he posited fetishism as the earliest (most primitive) stage, followed by polytheism and monotheism. However, ethnography and anthropology would classify some artifacts of monotheistic religions as fetishes. 

The eighteenth-century intellectuals who articulated the theory of fetishism encountered this notion in descriptions of "Guinea" contained in such popular voyage collections as Ramusio's Viaggio e Navigazioni (1550), de Bry's India Orientalis (1597), Purchas's Hakluytus Posthumus (1625), Churchill's Collection of Voyages and Travels (1732), Astley's A New General Collection of Voyages and Travels (1746), and Prevost's Histoire generale des voyages (1748).

The theory of fetishism was articulated at the end of the eighteenth century by G. W. F. Hegel in Lectures on the Philosophy of History. According to Hegel, Africans were incapable of abstract thought, their ideas and actions were governed by impulse, and therefore a fetish object could be anything that then was arbitrarily imbued with imaginary powers.

Practice

The use of the concept in the study of religion derives from studies of traditional West African religious beliefs, as well as from Vodun, which in turn derives from those beliefs.

Fetishes were commonly used in some Native American religions and practices. For example, the bear represented the shaman, the buffalo was the provider, the mountain lion was the warrior, and the wolf was the pathfinder the cause of the war.

Japan 
Kato Genchi cited jewelry, swords, mirrors, and scarves as examples of fetishism in Shinto. Kato stated that leaving behind cities and going into rural areas, he could find many traces of animism, fetishism, and phallicism.

Kato Genchi stated that the Ten Sacred Treasures were fetishes and the Imperial Regalia of Japan retained the same traits, and pointed out the similarities with the Pusaka of the natives of the East Indies and the Tjurunga of the Central Australians. The Kusanagi no Tsurugi was believed to provide supernatural protection (blessings) through the spiritual experience of the divine sword, and the Kusanagi no Tsurugi was deified and enshrined at Atsuta in Owari Province, which is now the Atsuta Shrine.

Akaruhime no Kami, the deity of Hiyurikuso Shrine, was said to be a red ball. In the Kami era, the jewel around Izanagi-no-Mikoto's neck was deified and called Mikuratana-kami.

William George Aston remarked that the sword at Atsuta Shrine was originally an offering and later became a sacred object, as an example of Fetishism. Sword was one of mitama-shiro (spirit representative, spirit-token), or more commonly known as the shintai (god-body). He observed that people tends to think of the mitama (spirit) of a deity first as the seat of his real presence, and second as the deity itself. Many people do not distinguish between mitama (spirit) and shintai (god-body), and some even confused shintai (god-body) with the god's real body. For example, cooking furnace (kamado) itself was worshipped as god. Noting the vagueness between highly imperfect symbol of deity and fetish worship, being worsened by the restricted uses of images (e.g., painting, sculpture), there was a strong tendency to even forget that there is a god by ascribing special virtues to certain physical objects.

Roy Andrew Miller observed that the Kokutai no Hongi and the Imperial Rescript on Education were also often worshipped as fetishes, and were respectfully placed and kept in household altars (kamidana).

Minkisi
Made and used by the BaKongo of western DRC, a nkisi (plural ) is a sculptural object that provides a local habitation for a spiritual personality. Though some  have always been anthropomorphic, they were probably much less naturalistic or "realistic" before the arrival of the Europeans in the nineteenth century; Kongo figures are more naturalistic in the coastal areas than inland. As Europeans tend to think of spirits as objects of worship, idols become the objects of idolatry when worship was addressed to false gods. In this way, Europeans regarded  as idols on the basis of false assumptions.

Europeans often called  "fetishes" and sometimes "idols" because they are sometimes rendered in human form. Modern anthropology has generally referred to these objects either as "power objects" or as "charms".

bears a relationship similar to that which Marx supposed that "political economy" bore to capitalism as its "religion", but not for the reasons advanced by Bosman, the Enlightenment thinkers, and Hegel. The irrationally "animate" character of the ritual system's symbolic apparatus, including , divination devices, and witch-testing ordeals, obliquely expressed real relations of power among the participants in ritual. "Fetishism" is about relations among people, rather than the objects that mediate and disguise those relations.

Therefore, McGaffey concludes, to call a  a fetish is to translate "certain Kongo realities into the categories developed in the emergent social sciences of nineteenth century, post-enlightenment Europe."

See also
Boli

References

External links
The Catholic Encyclopaedia: Fetishism
pp. 147–159.

Anthropology of religion
Religious objects
Amulets
Talismans
Cult images